Via Giuseppe Garibaldi is a street in the historical centre of Genoa, in Northwestern Italy, well known for its ancient palaces. It is one of the Strade Nuove (Italian for "new streets") built by the Genoese aristocracy during the Renaissance. Since July 2006 it is inscribed in the list of UNESCO World Heritage Site Genoa: the Strade Nuove and the system of the Palazzi dei Rolli.

History 
The street, sanctioned in 1550, was built in 1558–1583. Originally named Strada Maggiore or Strada Nuova, in 1882 it was dedicated to Giuseppe Garibaldi. The street is 250 metres long and 7.5 metres wide.

Between the first half of the 16th century and the first half of the 17th century, the nobility of the Republic of Genoa started a careful town planning to transform the existing medieval city and initiate a sizeable urban expansion to the North. The move to expand the antique palaces and to build new sumptuous ones was driven by the extraordinary wealth that came into the city through prosperous financing activities towards several European powers. In particular, the Genoese aristocracy financed the expensive undertakings of the Spanish Crown, such as the mercenary army that Spain kept in Flanders from 1566 to the peace of Westphalia in 1648. The ruling class of Genoa, mixing nobility of blood with new mercantile wealth, sought to underpin their prestige by the construction of grand city palaces and suburban villas of unusual splendor.

Palaces listed as a UNESCO World Heritage Site

In literature 

Charles Dickens gave a suggestive description of Strada Nuova in his travelogue Pictures from Italy.

Gallery

See also 
 Genoa: The Strade Nuove and the system of the Palazzi dei Rolli
 Via Balbi
 Via Cairoli (Genoa)
 Republic of Genoa
 Genoa

Notes

Bibliography 
 Fiorella Caraceni (1992), Una strada rinascimentale: via Garibaldi a Genova, Genova, SAGEP
 Giorgio Doria (1995), Nobiltà e investimenti a Genova in Età moderna, Genova
 Gioconda Pomella (2007), Guida Completa ai Palazzi dei Rolli Genova, Genova, De Ferrari Editore()
 Mauro Quercioli (2008), I Palazzi dei Rolli di Genova, Roma, Libreria dello Stato
 Fiorella Caraceni Poleggi (2001), Palazzi Antichi e Moderni di Genova raccolti e disegnati da Pietro Paolo Rubens (1652), Genova, Tormena Editore
 Mario Labò (2003), I palazzi di Genova di P.P. Rubens, Genova, Nuova Editrice Genovese

External links 

 Strada Nuova.it 

Buildings and structures in Genoa
Tourist attractions in Genoa